The Ferdinand Bordewijk Prize or F. Bordewijk-prijs is a literary award, presented annually by the Jan Campert Foundation to the author of the best Dutch prose book.

The prize was established in 1948 as the 'Vijverberg Prize', and has been named after the Dutch author Ferdinand Bordewijk since 1979. The prize includes a cash prize of € 6000, - (2019).

Winners

Vijverberg Prize
 1948 - Jo Boer for Kruis of munt
 1949 - not awarded
 1950 - Josepha Mendels for Als wind en rook
 1951 - Theun de Vries for  Anna Casparii of Het heimwee
 1953 - Albert Helman for  De laaiende stilte
 1954 - Max Croiset for the play Amphitryon
 1955 - not awarded
 1956 - Albert van der Hoogte for Het laatste uur
 1957 - not awarded
 1958 - Marga Minco for Het bittere kruid
 1959 - Jos. Panhuijsen for Wandel in het water
 1960 - not awarded
 1961 - Boeli van Leeuwen for De rots der struikeling
 1962 - J.W. Holsbergen for De handschoenen van het verraad
 1963 - Harry Mulisch for De zaak 40/61
 1964 - Jacques Hamelink for Het plantaardig bewind
 1965 - Alfred Kossmann for De smaak van groene kaas
 1966 - Willem Frederik Hermans for Beyond Sleep (Nooit meer slapen) (not accepted)
 1967 - Jeroen Brouwers for Joris Ockeloen en het wachten
 1968 - Geert van Beek for De steek van een schorpioen
 1969 - Ivo Michiels for Orchis militaris
 1970 - Jaap Harten for Garbo en de broeders Grimm
 1971 - Bert Schierbeek for Inspraak
 1972 - Anton Koolhaas for Blaffen zonder onraad
 1973 - Kees Simhoffer for Een geile gifkikker
 1974 - William D. Kuik for De held van het potspel
 1975 - Daniël Robberechts for Praag schrijven
 1976 - Adriaan van der Veen for In liefdesnaam
 1977 - J. Bernlef for De man in het midden
 1978 - F.B. Hotz for Ernstvuurwerk
Ferdinand Bordewijk Prize
 1979 - Willem Brakman for Zes subtiele verhalen
 1980 - Oek de Jong for Opwaaiende zomerjurken
 1981 - Cees Nooteboom for Rituals (Rituelen)
 1982 - F. Springer for Bougainville
 1983 - Willem G. van Maanen for Het nichtje van Mozart
 1984 - Armando for Machthebbers
 1985 - Maarten Biesheuvel for Reis door mijn kamer
 1986 - A.F.Th. van der Heijden for De gevarendriehoek
 1987 - Frans Kellendonk for Mystiek lichaam
 1988 - Hermine de Graaf for De regels van het huis
 1989 - Jeroen Brouwers for De zondvloed
 1990 - Leo Pleysier for Wit is altijd schoon
 1991 - Jan Siebelink for De overkant van de rivier
 1992 - Jacq Firmin Vogelaar for De dood als meisje van acht
 1993 - Robert Anker for De terugkeer van kapitein Rob
 1994 - Louis Ferron for De walsenkoning
 1995 - Nicolaas Matsier for Gesloten huis
 1996 - Wessel te Gussinklo for De opdracht
 1997 - J.J. Voskuil for Meneer Beerta en Vuile handen
 1998 - Helga Ruebsamen for Het lied en de waarheid
 1999 - Gijs IJlander for Twee harten op een schotel
 2000 - Peter Verhelst for Tongkat; Een verhalenbordeel
 2001 - Kees van Beijnum for De oesters van Nam Kee
 2002 - Stefan Hertmans for Als op de eerste dag
 2003 - L.H. Wiener for Nestor
 2004 - Arnon Grunberg for De asielzoeker
 2005 - Paul Verhaeghen for Omega Minor
 2006 - Tommy Wieringa for Joe Speedboot
 2007 - Marcel Möring for Dis
 2008 - Doeschka Meijsing for Over de liefde
 2009 - Marie Kessels for Ruw

 2010 - Koen Peeters for De bloemen
 2011 - Gustaaf Peek for Ik was Amerika
 2012 - Stephan Enter for Grip
 2013 - Oek de Jong for Pier en oceaan
 2014 - Jan van Mersbergen for De laatste ontsnapping
 2015 - Annelies Verbeke for Dertig dagen
 2016 - Anton Valens for Het compostcirculatieplan
 2017 - Jeroen Olyslaegers for WIL
 2018 - Jan van Aken for De ommegang
 2019 - Marente de Moor for Foon
 2020 - Anjet Daanje for De herinnerde soldaat
 2021 - Marieke Lucas Rijneveld for Mijn lieve gunsteling
 2022 - Donald Niedekker for Waarachtige beschrijvingen uit de permafrost

External links 
 Website Jan Campert Foundation

Dutch literary awards
Awards established in 1979
Awards established in 1948